List of cultural heritage landmarks of national significance in Donetsk Oblast.

Listings

List of historic and cultural reserves

 State Historic and Architectural Reserve in Sviatohirsk

List of scientific objects of national inheritance (heritage)
Note: it is a mixed list that includes objects of both cultural heritage as well as natural heritage with emphasis on science.
 Geological landscape and biological diversity of biota of the "Stone (Kamiani) Graves" Reserve (village Nazarivka)
 Exposition "Steppes of Ukraine" of the Donetsk Botanic Garden
 Exposition and collection of tropical and subtropical plants of the Donetsk Botanic Garden
 Complex of unique installations and accessories to test high voltage electrical equipment of insulating structures of the State company "Scientific and Research Institute of High Voltage" (Sloviansk)
 Test site of high-voltage lines supports of power transmissions and tower structures of the Donbas State Academy of Construction and Architecture (Makiivka)

References
 Rada.gov.ua: Objects of cultural heritage of national significance in the State Registry of Immobile Landmarks of Ukraine — 2009 Resolution of Cabinet of Ministers of Ukraine''.

 01
.
.
.cultural heritage landmarks
History of Donetsk Oblast
Tourism in Donetsk Oblast
Donetsk Oblast